Aldo Canti (born 9 March 1961 in Montmorency, France) is a French and later Sammarinese former sprinter who competed at the 1984 Summer Olympics and in the 1992 Summer Olympics.

Competition record

1Representing Europe

Personal bests
Outdoor
100 metres – 10.42 (+1.6 m/s, Montgeron 1987)
200 metres – 20.69 (+0.3 m/s, Villeneuve-d'Ascq 1984)
400 metres – 45.09 (Zürich 1984)

Indoor
200 metres – 21.50 (Budapest 1983)
400 metres – 47.13 (Liévin 1987)

References

All-Athletics profile

1961 births
Living people
People from Montmorency, Val-d'Oise
Sportspeople from Val-d'Oise
Sammarinese male sprinters
French male sprinters
French people of Sammarinese descent
Olympic athletes of France
Olympic athletes of San Marino
Athletes (track and field) at the 1984 Summer Olympics
Athletes (track and field) at the 1992 Summer Olympics
World Athletics Championships athletes for France
Mediterranean Games gold medalists for France
Athletes (track and field) at the 1983 Mediterranean Games
Athletes (track and field) at the 1991 Mediterranean Games
Universiade medalists in athletics (track and field)
Mediterranean Games medalists in athletics
Universiade bronze medalists for France
Medalists at the 1981 Summer Universiade
Medalists at the 1983 Summer Universiade